The National Training Service (SENA) is a Colombian public institution aimed to develop vocational training programs for the Colombian labor force as a means to increase the competitiveness of Colombia's enterprises. It's a government initiative to develop education in Colombia and foment employment.

Throughout its more than 50 years, SENA has been highlighted as one of the most important centers of technical and technological education in Latin America, their educational programs focus on areas such as administration, agriculture, architecture, construction, design, electricity, electronics, mechanics and technology.

References

External links
 Virtual Education

Educational organisations based in Colombia
Ministry of Labour (Colombia)